Sir Philip Redmond  (born 10 June 1949) is an English television producer and screenwriter from Huyton, England. He is known for creating the television series Grange Hill, Brookside and Hollyoaks.

Early life
Redmond took the 11-plus and passed, but attended St Kevin's RC School in Northwood, Kirkby (it became All Saints Catholic High School, Kirkby). His mother was a cleaner and his father was a bus driver. 

He left school with four O-levels and one A-level and trained to become a quantity surveyor. He studied Sociology at the University of Liverpool.

Career
Redmond wrote episodes for the ITV sitcom Doctor in Charge and children's series The Kids from 47A. He became well known for creating several popular television series such as Grange Hill (BBC One, 1978–2008), for which he based his first ideas on his time at St Kevin's, Brookside (Channel 4, 1982–2003), Rownd a Rownd (S4C 1995—) and Hollyoaks (Channel 4, 1995—). For over twenty years he also ran his own independent production company, Mersey Television, before selling off the company in 2005. Redmond also created the daytime legal drama, The Courtroom, which was cancelled after 38 episodes.

In 2013, Redmond's autobiography Mid-Term Report was published. He released his first novel, Highbridge, in 2016.

Honours
Redmond is an Ambassador Fellow at Liverpool John Moores University.

In November 2010 he was awarded the Honorary degree of Doctor of Letters (D.Litt) from the University of Chester.  

He is Chair of National Museums Liverpool and of the UK City of Culture Independent Advisory Panel.

In February 2012, Redmond declared an interest in running for the role of Elected Mayor of Liverpool.

Appointed Commander of the Order of the British Empire (CBE) in the 2004 Birthday Honours for services to drama, he was knighted in the 2020 Birthday Honours for services to broadcasting and arts in the regions.

References

External links

1949 births
Academics of Liverpool John Moores University
Alumni of the University of Liverpool
British male television writers
Brookside
Commanders of the Order of the British Empire
English male writers
English television producers
English television writers
Knights Bachelor
Living people
People from Huyton
Soap opera producers